Joel DeLass (born September 20, 1986 in Spring Lake, Michigan) is an American soccer coach and former player.

Career

College and amateur
DeLass attended Western Michigan Christian High School, who he helped lead to State and League Championships, and where he was a First Team All-State, All-Region, All-District, All-Area and All-Conference selection in 2003 and 2004

He subsequently played four years of college soccer at Wheaton College. He was an All-CCIW Second Team selection as a sophomore in 2006 and as a junior in 2007, and was his team's captain in his senior year, leading them in scoring, while being named CCIW Player of the Year and earning a spot on the NSCAA Division III All-America First Team and Central Region First Team.

During his college years DeLass also played in the USL Premier Development League with West Michigan Edge.

Professional
Undrafted out of college, DeLass turned professional in 2010 when signed with the Charlotte Eagles of the USL Second Division. He made his professional debut on April 17, 2010 in a game against Charleston Battery.

DeLass signed with Dayton Dutch Lions of the USL Pro league on March 29, 2011. He re-signed with the club in January 2012.

During the 2012 campaign, DeLass appeared in every match for the Dutch Lions, notching a league high 2,160 minutes in the regular season along with an additional 390 minutes in US Open Cup play. He contributed 1 goal and 1 assist in USLPRO action and scored what proved to be the match winner against the Michigan Bucks to send the Dutch Lions to the quarterfinals of the US Open Cup.
The consistency and stability he provided in the midfield for the Dutch Lions saw his performance in the 2012 season earn him a spot on the 2012 USLPRO All League Second Team, despite the team’s 4-10-10 record.

Coaching
In 2021, after stints as an assistant coach for USL League One sides Lansing Ignite and Union Omaha, DeLass joined the coaching staff of USL Championship side Real Monarchs.

References

External links
 Charlotte Eagles bio

1986 births
Living people
American soccer players
West Michigan Edge players
Charlotte Eagles players
Dayton Dutch Lions players
USL League Two players
USL Second Division players
USL Championship players
Soccer players from Michigan
People from Spring Lake, Michigan
Association football midfielders
Wheaton Thunder men's soccer players
Lansing Ignite FC
Union Omaha
Real Monarchs coaches